Hear No Evil is the second album by American composer Bill Laswell. It was released on March 21, 1988, by Venture and Virgin Records.

Track listing

Personnel 
Adapted from the Hear No Evil liner notes.

Musicians
Aïyb Dieng – percussion
Zakir Hussain – percussion
Bill Laswell – bass guitar, producer
Daniel Ponce – percussion
L. Shankar – violin
Nicky Skopelitis – guitar

Technical
Martin Bisi – recording, mixing
Thi-Linh Le – photography
Robert Musso – engineering
Howie Weinberg – mastering

Release history

References

External links 
 
 Hear No Evil at Bandcamp

1988 albums
Bill Laswell albums
Virgin Records albums
Albums produced by Bill Laswell